is a Japanese four-panel seinen manga magazine published by Houbunsha. It is the third magazine of the "Kirara" series, after "Manga Time Kirara" and "Manga Time Kirara Carat". The first issue was released on September 29, 2004. Currently the magazine is released on the 19th of each month.

History

Supplement issue 

 May 24, 2004 - Created as the supplement issue of "Manga Time Kirara" (Vol.1). Since it was a supplement issue, only one issue is published.

Monthly magazine 
Until July 19, 2019, it was 15 years after first issue, and the latest issue number is No.179.

 September 29, 2004 - First issue is published as November issue, 2004. Starting from this issue, issue number is recorded as "Month" Issue and No.○, published on the 29th of each month.
September 20, 2005 - Since November issue, 2005, it was changed to release on 19th of each month and the price is changed.
July 19, 2006 - Since September issue, 2006, the serif of logo "MAX" was changed and the design is renewed.
October 18, 2008 - December issue, 2008 was released, and it had an issue number No.50.
September 19, 2009 - September issue, 2009 was released. It was 5th anniversary since it became an independent publication. A comic anthology of Kanamemo, which celebrates the 5th anniversary, was included. 
March 19, 2010 - May issue, 2010 was released. The issue number on the cover and side had a minor change.
December 19, 2012 - February issue, 2013 was released. It was the 100th issue and it had an anniversary cover.
June 19, 2013 - August issue, 2013 was released. It announced the held of "2013 Summer Reading Report Contest", which collects the article of readers based on manga serialized on this magazine. In the November issue, 2013, outstanding work was posted.
August 19, 2014 - October issue, 2014 was released. It is a commemorative issue and a 10th anniversary booklet, "MAXX" was included.
February 18, 2017 - April, 2017 was released and it is the No.150 issue.

Ongoing serialized manga

Finished manga series

Anime adaptations 
 Kanamemo - Summer 2009
 Kin-iro Mosaic - Summer 2013
 Is the Order a Rabbit? - Spring 2014
 Hello!! Kin-iro Mosaic - Spring 2015
 Is the Order a Rabbit?? - Fall 2015
 Magic of Stella - Fall 2016
 Comic Girls - Spring 2018
 Is the Order a Rabbit? BLOOM - Fall 2020
 Bocchi the Rock! - Fall 2022

Game adaptations
 Miracle Girls Festival – December 17, 2015
 Is the Order a Rabbit?? Wonderful Party! - March 3, 2016
 Kin-iro Mosaic Memories - December 27, 2016
 Kirara Fantasia – December 11, 2017

References

External links
  
 

Monthly manga magazines published in Japan
Magazines established in 2004
Seinen manga magazines
Yonkoma
Houbunsha magazines
2004 establishments in Japan